The Law Debenture Corporation plc is a leading British-based investment trust dedicated to a diversified range of investments. It also provides a range of fiduciary services including appointment of agents, directors and trustees for pension funds, trusts and companies. It is listed on the London Stock Exchange and is a constituent of the FTSE 250 Index.

History
The company was first established in 1889, by Stanley Boulter, who remained chairman until his death in 1917. In 2007 it acquired Delaware Corporate Services Inc., a provider of legal and corporate services, and Safecall Limited, a provider of whistle-blowing services.

Operations
The company has operations organised as follows:
 Investment Trust
 Provision of independent professional services

References

External links
 Official site

Financial services companies established in 1889
Financial services companies based in the City of London
Investment trusts of the United Kingdom
1889 establishments in the United Kingdom
Companies listed on the London Stock Exchange